State Route 135 (SR 135) is a  state highway in southern Baldwin County in the southwestern part of the U.S. state of Alabama. The southern terminus of the highway is at an intersection with SR 182 in Gulf Shores. The northern terminus of the route is at an intersection with SR 180, also in Gulf Shores. It serves as a connecting route between those two highways. The entire highway is inside the boundary of Gulf State Park.

Route description
SR 135 begins at an intersection with SR 182 (East Beach Boulevard) in the southwestern part of Gulf State Park. It curves to the northwest and passes Shelby Lake. Then, it curves to the west-northwest before curving back to the northwest. It crosses over State Lake Channel and then curves to the northeast. Then, it curves to the west-southwest and intersects SR 180 (East Fort Morgan Road/East 2nd Street) on the western edge of the park.

Major intersections

See also

References

135
Transportation in Baldwin County, Alabama